Mustafino (Mostafa) is a rural locality (a village) in Allaguvatsky Selsoviet, Sterlibashevsky District, Bashkortostan, Russia. The population was 184 in 2010. There are three streets.

Geography 
Mustafino is located 33 km southeast of Sterlibashevo (the district's administrative centre) by road. Nordovka is the nearest rural locality.

References 

Rural localities in Sterlibashevsky District